Calvin Russell is the name of:
 Calvin Russell (American football) (born 1983), American football player
 Calvin Russell (musician) (1948–2011), American singer-songwriter and guitarist